Karkala taluk is a taluk in the Udupi District of the Indian state of Karnataka. The headquarters is the town of Karkala. The taluk's capital has a population of about 26,000.

References

Taluks of Karnataka
Geography of Udupi district